Yakov Iosifovich Dzhugashvili ( – 14 April 1943) was the eldest child of Joseph Stalin, the son of Stalin's first wife, Kato Svanidze, who died nine months after his birth. His father, then a young revolutionary in his mid-20s, left the child to be raised by his late wife's family. In 1921, when Dzhugashvili had reached the age of fourteen, he was brought to Moscow, where his father had become a leading figure in the Bolshevik government, eventually becoming head of the Soviet Union. Disregarded by Stalin, Dzhugashvili was a shy, quiet child who appeared unhappy and tried to commit suicide several times as a youth. Married twice, Dzhugashvili had three children, two of whom reached adulthood.

Dzhugashvili studied to become an engineer, then – on his father's insistence – he enrolled in training to be an artillery officer. He finished his studies weeks before Nazi Germany invaded the Soviet Union in 1941. Sent to the front, he was imprisoned by the Germans and died at the Sachsenhausen concentration camp in 1943 after his father refused to make a deal to secure his release.

Early life

Georgia
Dzhugashvili was born  in Baji, a village in the Kutais Governorate of the Russian Empire (now in Georgia). His mother, Kato Svanidze, was from Racha and a descendant of minor Georgian nobility. His father, Ioseb Dzhugashvili, was from Gori and was a Bolshevik revolutionary. A few months after Dzhugashvili's birth, his father was involved in a high-profile Tiflis bank robbery, and the three of them fled to Baku to avoid arrest. They rented a "Tartar house with a low ceiling on the Bailov Peninsula" just outside the city right on the sea. They returned to Tiflis in October that year as Svanidze was quite ill. Ioseb left Tiflis immediately after her death, abandoning 8-month-old Iakob to be raised by his Svanidze relatives. Ioseb, who later adopted the name Joseph Stalin, would not return to visit his son for several years, and Iakob would spend the next fourteen years being raised by his aunts.

Moscow
In 1921, Dzhugashvili was brought to Moscow to live with his father. His half-siblings Svetlana and Vasily were born after he moved. This proved difficult for Dzhugashvili as he did not understand Russian and his father was hostile to him, even forbidding Dzhugashvili to adopt the name "Stalin." It is not clear why Stalin had hostility to his son, but it is believed that he reminded Stalin of Svanidze, which was one of the happier times in Stalin's life. Living in Stalin's apartments at the Amusement Palace in the Kremlin, Dzhugashvili slept in the dining room. A kind individual, Dzhughashvili was close to his half-siblings, as well as his step-mother Nadezhda Alliluyeva, who was only six years older than him.

Though Dzhugashvili was interested in studying at a university, Stalin did not initially allow it, and it was not until 1930 when he was 23 that Dzhugashvili was admitted. He graduated from the Institute of Transport in 1935, and for the next couple years worked as a chimney-sweep engineer at an electric plant factory named after his father. In 1937, he entered the Artillery Academy, and graduated from there on 9 May 1941.

Marriages and family
Dzhugashvili's first serious relationship was with Zoya Gunina, the daughter of an Orthodox priest and a former classmate of his. In 1928, Dzhugashvili made it known that he wanted to marry Zoya, who was then sixteen. Stalin became enraged at the idea and in response Dzhugashvili attempted suicide, shooting himself in the chest and narrowly missing his heart. While Alliluyeva and Svetlana helped Dzhugashvili, Stalin is reported to have brushed off the attempt by saying "He can't even shoot straight." Dzhugashvili spent several months in the hospital recovering from this ordeal, though the couple did ultimately marry and moved to Leningrad. A daughter was born on 7 February 1929, but she died eight months later of pneumonia and Dzhugashvili and Gunina split up, although they did not officially divorce.

After his return to Moscow, Dzhugashvili was rumoured to be marrying Ketevan Orakhelashvili, the daughter of Mamia Orakhelashvili, the First Secretary of the Transcaucasian Socialist Federative Soviet Republic. However, Dzhugashvili was shy around her so she instead married Evgeni Mikeladze, a prominent orchestra conductor, earning ridicule from Stalin. His next girlfriend was Olga Golysheva, who was also a student at the Moscow Aviation School. They became engaged but soon that ended and she returned to her home in the Stalingrad Oblast. A son, Yevgeny was born on 10 January 1936, after Golysheva returned home. Dzugashvili only learnt of his son in 1938 and ensured he took his surname, though Stalin never recognised Yevgeny as his grandson.

Dzhugashvili married Yulia Meltzer, a well-known Jewish dancer from Odessa. After meeting Meltzer at a reception in a restaurant, Dzhugashvili fought with her second husband, an NKVD officer called Nikolai Bessarab, an aide to Stanislav Redens, the head of the Moscow Oblast NKVD and brother-in-law of Stalin. They soon were married. Historian Miklós Kun has suggested that Meltzer "must have been tempted to gain entry into Stalin’s court by means of her marriage," though this did not work due to the animosity between Stalin and Dzhugashvili. They soon moved into an apartment together, though were only legally married on 18 February 1938, the day before their only child, daughter Galina, was born.

Second World War

Capture

On 22 June 1941, Nazi Germany and its allies launched Operation Barbarossa, the invasion of the Soviet Union. Stalin ensured that Dzughashvili and Artyom Sergeyev, his adopted son and fellow artillery officer, went to the front lines. Serving as a lieutenant with a battery of the 14th Howitzer Regiment of the 14th Tank Division near Vitebsk, Dzhugashvili was captured on 16 July during the Battle of Smolensk. The circumstances of his capture are disputed: Sergeyev later said that "the Germans surrounded Yakov’s battery. The order was given to retreat. But Yakov did not obey the order. I tried to persuade him... but Yakov answered: 'I am the son of Stalin and I do not permit the battery to retreat." Other sources, including Soviet prisoners interrogated, claimed that they willingly gave up Dzhugashvili as they hated the Soviet system. Material from the Russian archives also suggests that he surrendered willingly.

The Germans announced the capture of Dzughashvili on 19 July. Stalin reacted negatively to the news: he had previously ordered that no soldiers were to surrender, so the idea that his own son had done so was seen as a disgrace. He was angry that Dzughashvili had not killed himself instead of being captured, and suspected that someone had betrayed him. Meltzer was not immediately told the news and, suspicious of her motives and the idea that Dzhugashvili surrendered, Stalin had her arrested. With Meltzer imprisoned, Svetlana took care of Galina.

Prisoner of war
In an attempt to conceal his identity, Dzhugashvili apparently removed his officer's insignia and tried to pass as a soldier, though he was soon recognised and given to the Abwehr (German military intelligence) for interrogation. During the interrogation, Dzughashvili openly criticised his division and other units of the Red Army, saying they were unprepared for the war, and further commented that military commanders behaved poorly. He felt that the United Kingdom was weak and had "never helped anyone," while praising Germany, noting it was the only major empire left and that the "whole of Europe would be nothing" without it. Though his wife and her family were ethnically Jewish, Dzughashvili was also openly anti-Semitic, claiming Jews "trade, or aspire to careers in engineering, but they do not want to be workers, technicians, or peasant laborers. That’s why no one in our country respects the Jews."

The Germans intended to use Dzhugashvili in their propaganda against the Soviets. He was pictured on leaflets dropped over Soviet soldiers, shown smiling with his captors. The back of the leaflet was part of a letter he wrote to Stalin shortly after his capture: "Dear Father! I have been taken prisoner. I am in good health. I will soon be sent to a camp for officers in Germany. I am being treated well. I wish you good health! Greetings to everyone. Yasha." The Soviet Union responded in kind via propaganda: Krasnaya Zvezda ("Red Star"), the official newspaper of the Red Army, announced on 15 August 1941 that Dzhugashvili would be awarded the Order of the Red Banner for his actions during the Battle of Smolensk. He was subsequently moved to a guarded villa in Berlin, where Joseph Goebbels, the Nazi Propaganda Minister, hoped to use him on Russian-language radio broadcasts. When that failed to materialise, Dzhugashvili was moved to Sachsenhausen concentration camp.

While interned there, Dzhugashvili was constantly frequented by visitors who wanted to meet and photograph the son of Stalin, meetings which began to distress him. He also quarrelled with the British prisoners, and would frequently get in physical altercations with them. After German field marshal Friedrich Paulus surrendered at the Battle of Stalingrad in February 1943, the Germans offered to exchange Dzhugashvili for him, although he specifically asked not be exchanged for a field marshal. This was outright refused by Stalin, who later stated "Just think how many sons ended in camps! Who would swap them for Paulus? Were they worse than Yakov?" Soviet Foreign Affairs Minister Vyacheslav Molotov also recounted that Stalin refused to swap his son for Paulus because "All of them [Soviet prisoners of war] are my sons." According to Nikolai Tolstoy, there was another proposal as well, with Hitler wanting to exchange Dzhugashvili for Hitler's nephew Leo Raubal; but this was not accepted either.

Death
On 14 April 1943, Dzhugashvili died at the Sachsenhausen camp. The details of his death are disputed: one account has him running into the electric fence surrounding the camp. However, it has also been suggested that he was shot by the Germans; Kun has noted that it is "conceivable that he committed suicide: he had suicidal tendencies in his youth." Upon hearing of his son's death, Stalin reportedly stared at his photograph; he would later soften his stance towards Dzhugashvili, saying he was "a real man" and that "fate treated him unjustly." Meltzer would be released in 1946 and re-united with Galina, though the years apart had made Galina distant from her mother. In 1977, Dzhugashvili was awarded the Order of the Patriotic War, first class, although this was done secretly and the family was not allowed to collect the medal itself.

After the war, British officers in charge of captured German archives came upon the papers depicting Dzhugashvili's death at Sachsenhausen. The German records indicated that he was shot after he ran into an electric fence attempting to flee after an argument with the British prisoners; autopsy showed he died from electrocution before he was shot. The British Foreign Office briefly considered presenting these papers to Stalin at the Potsdam Conference as a gesture of condolence. They scrapped the idea because neither the British nor the Americans had informed the Soviets that they had captured key German archives, and sharing those papers with Stalin would have prompted the Soviets to inquire about the source of these records.

See also
Mao Anying

References

Notes

Citations

Bibliography

 
 
 
 
 
 
 
 
 
 
 
 

1907 births
1943 deaths
Executed people from Georgia (country)
Executed Soviet people from Georgia (country)
People executed by Germany by firearm
People from Imereti
People from Kutais Governorate
Children of Joseph Stalin
Military personnel who died in Nazi concentration camps
People from Georgia (country) executed in Nazi concentration camps
People of World War II from Georgia (country)
People who died in Sachsenhausen concentration camp
Recipients of the Order of the Red Banner
Soviet military personnel killed in World War II
Soviet prisoners of war
World War II prisoners of war held by Germany